The women's 1500 metres event  at the 2001 IAAF World Indoor Championships was held on March 10–11.

Medalists

Results

Heats
First 3 of each heat (Q) and the next 3 fastest (q) qualified for the semifinals.

Final

References
Results

1500
1500 metres at the World Athletics Indoor Championships
2001 in women's athletics